Museums in England is a link page for any museum in England by ceremonial county. In 2011 there were around 1,600 museums in England.  The Museums, Libraries and Archives Council is the national development agency for museums in England, and is a sponsored body of the Department for Culture, Media and Sport.

Bedfordshire

See also :Category:Museums in Bedfordshire.

Berkshire

See also :Category:Museums in Berkshire.

City of Bristol

See also :Category:Museums in Bristol.

Buckinghamshire

See also :Category:Museums in Buckinghamshire.

Cambridgeshire

See also :Category:Museums in Cambridgeshire.

Cheshire

See also :Category:Museums in Cheshire.

Cornwall

See also :Category:Museums in Cornwall.

Cumbria

See also :Category:Museums in Cumbria.

Derbyshire

See also :Category:Museums in Derbyshire.

Devon

See also :Category:Museums in Devon.

Dorset

See also :Category:Museums in Dorset.

County Durham

See also :Category:Museums in County Durham.

East Riding of Yorkshire

See also :Category:Museums in the East Riding of Yorkshire.

East Sussex

See also :Category:Museums in East Sussex.

Essex

See also :Category:Museums in Essex.

Gloucestershire

See also :Category:Museums in Gloucestershire.

Greater London

See also :Category:Museums in London.

Greater Manchester

See also :Category:Museums in Greater Manchester.

Hampshire

See also :Category:Museums in Hampshire.

Herefordshire

See also :Category:Museums in Herefordshire.

Hertfordshire

See also :Category:Museums in Hertfordshire.

Isle of Wight

See also :Category:Museums on the Isle of Wight.

Kent

See also :Category:Museums in Kent.

Lancashire

See also :Category:Museums in Lancashire.

Leicestershire

See also :Category:Museums in Leicestershire.

Lincolnshire

See also :Category:Museums in Lincolnshire.

Merseyside

See also :Category:Museums in Merseyside.

Norfolk

See also :Category:Museums in Norfolk.

Northamptonshire

See also :Category:Museums in Northamptonshire.

Northumberland

See also :Category:Museums in Northumberland.

North Yorkshire

See also :Category:Museums in North Yorkshire.

Nottinghamshire

See also :Category:Museums in Nottinghamshire.

Oxfordshire

See also :Category:Museums in Oxfordshire.

Rutland

See also :Category:Museums in Rutland.

Shropshire

See also :Category:Museums in Shropshire.

Somerset

See also :Category:Museums in Somerset.

South Yorkshire

See also :Category:Museums in South Yorkshire.

Staffordshire

See also :Category:Museums in Staffordshire.

Suffolk

See also :Category:Museums in Suffolk.

Surrey

See also :Category:Museums in Surrey.

Tyne and Wear

See also :Category:Museums in Tyne and Wear.

Warwickshire

See also :Category:Museums in Warwickshire.

West Midlands

See also :Category:Museums in the West Midlands (county).

West Sussex

See also :Category:Museums in West Sussex.

West Yorkshire

See also :Category:Museums in West Yorkshire.

Wiltshire

See also :Category:Museums in Wiltshire.

Worcestershire

See also :Category:Museums in Worcestershire.

See also
List of British railway museums
List of museums
Museums in Northern Ireland
Museums in the Republic of Ireland
Museums in Scotland
Museums in Wales

References

External links
Culture 24 — A Guide to British museums
The Museums Association - Organisation for Museum Professionals
Museum, Libraries and Archives Council
Visitor figures for Department of Culture, Media and Sport sponsored museums in England

 
England
Museums
Museums